Rudy Adrian (born Rudy Hueting; 1965) is an ambient musician from Dunedin in New Zealand. Working in styles ranging from beatless atmospheric music to heavily sequenced electronica, Adrian has released several albums of his music, as well as producing sound track for television in his profession as a sound engineer for Taylormade Media. He is also one of the hosts of a radio programme specialising in ambient music on the Dunedin campus radio station, Radio One.

Adrian's albums form two distinct series: "Atmospheric Works" and "Sequencer Sketches". His first mini-album, SubAntarctica (initially released under his birth name of Rudy Hueting) was as part of a multi-media collaboration on art in the Subantarctic, and involved him and several other artists travelling to the Campbell and Auckland Islands and producing work based on the experience. His albums have included collaborations with New Zealand flautist Nick Prosser and Dutch keyboardist Ron Boots.

Adrian has toured New Zealand and the United States, presenting works in a variety of venues ranging from concert halls to planetaria.

Discography

SubAntarctica – Atmospheric Works Vol. 1 (originally released 1992; re-released in extended form 1999)
Twilight – Atmospheric Works Vol. 2 (1999)
Kinetic Flow – Sequencer Sketches Vol. 1 (2000; Groove Unlimited Records)
The Healing Lake (2000; White Cloud)
Iridescence – Sequencer Sketches Vol. 2 (2001; Groove Unlimited Records)
Concerts in New Zealand 2000–2001 (live, with Nick Prosser) (Quantum Records)
Across the Silver River (with Ron Boots) (2002; Groove Unlimited Records)
Starfields – Sequencer Sketches Vol. 3 (2002; Groove Unlimited Records)
Concerts in the USA (2003; Groove Unlimited)
Moonwater (2006; Lotuspike)
Par Avion – Sequencer Sketches Vol. 4 (2007; Groove Unlimited Records)
Par Avion (Bonus CDr) (2007; not on label)
Desert Realms (2008; Lotuspike)
Desert Realms Out-Takes (CDr) (2008; not on label)
Distant Stars (2010; Lotuspike)
Atmospheres (2014; Spotted Peccary)
Coastlines (2016; Spotted Peccary)
Sequencer Rarities (2017; Groove Unlimited)
Woodlands (2019, Spotted Peccary)
As Dusk Becomes Night (2021, Spotted Peccary)

See also 
List of ambient music artists

External links
Star's End Rudy Adrian page
Rudy Adrian's website

References

Ambient musicians
New Zealand musicians
Musicians from Dunedin
1960s births
Living people